The Lark Streamliner is an electric streamliner motorcycle built to challenge the standing land speed record for two-wheeled vehicles. The builder, Shea Nyquist, is an American aerospace engineer educated at San Jose State University. Nyquist salvaged many of the parts, including the 22 kWh LiFePO4 battery pack and the 200 kW electric motor. It was reported in 2019 that the vehicle reached  at 10% throttle. The machine weighs  without fairings.   The fairings are made from secondhand carbon fiber by Nyquist in his barn.

As of 2021, Nyquist plans to run the bike at Bonneville salt flats.  The motorcycle will run in the Omega class as a streamliner motorcycle.  Standing SCTA record is 175mph.

References

Further reading

External links

Motorcycles of the United States
Electric motorcycles
Land speed record motorcycles
Streamliner motorcycles
Feet forwards motorcycles